Fútbol Sala Baix Maestrat was a futsal club based in Benicarló, city of the province of Castellón in the autonomous community of Valencian Community.

The club was founded in 1996 and its pavilion was Municipal de Benicarló with capacity of 2,000 seaters.

The club was sponsored ultimately by Ayuntamiento de Benicarló and Aeroport Castelló.

History
The club was disbanded in February 2012, due to large amounts of embargoes sustained and the impossibility to raise funds.

Sponsors
Proyastec – 1999–2000
Povet.com – 2000–2004
Ayuntamiento de Benicarló – 2004–2005
Grupo Poblet – 2005–2006
Onda Urbana – 2006–2007
Ayuntamiento de Benicarló – 2007–2008
Aeroport Castelló – 2008–2011

Season to season

7 seasons in Primera División
5 seasons in Segunda División
3 seasons in Segunda División B

Last squad 2011/12

References

External links
Official Website

Futsal clubs in Spain
Sports teams in the Valencian Community
Futsal clubs established in 1996
Sports clubs disestablished in 2012
1996 establishments in Spain
2012 disestablishments in Spain